Randolph is an unincorporated community in Ward Township, Randolph County, in the U.S. state of Indiana.

History
Randolph was originally known as Randolph Station, and under the latter name was founded in 1836. A post office was established under the name Randolph in 1837, and remained in operation until it was discontinued in 1900.

Geography

References

Unincorporated communities in Randolph County, Indiana
Unincorporated communities in Indiana